Bakesh-e Do Rural District is a rural district (dehestan) in the Central District of Mamasani County, Fars Province, Iran. At the 2006 census, its population was 6,625, in 1,391 families.  The rural district has 37 villages.

References 

Rural Districts of Fars Province
Mamasani County